Birth of a Notion may refer to:

Birth of a Notion (film), a 1947 Looney Tunes short
"Birth of a Notion" (short story), by Isaac Asimov
Birth of a Notion, an album by jazz composer and musician Edward Wilkerson
"Birth of a Notion", an episode of the Canadian television series Black Harbour
"The Good, The Bad And The Squishy / Birth Of A Notion", an episode of the animated series Eek! The Cat

See also
The Birth of a Nation, a landmark early film